Backchat is a ballet made by Eliot Feld for his Ballet Tech company to "Idle Chatter Junior" by Paul Lansky. The premiere took place October 21, 2004, during the company's MANDANCE PROJECT season at the Joyce Theater, New York. The New York City Ballet premiere of Backchat was Saturday, April 29, 2006, at the New York State Theater, Lincoln Center.

Original casts

ManDance Project 
Wu-Kang Chen
Nickemil Concepcion
Jason Jordan

NYCB 
Adrian Danchig-Waring
Craig Hall
Andrew Veyette

External links 
NY Times review by Anna Kisselgoff October 23, 2004 of Ballet Tech's MANDANCE PROJECT at the Joyce Theater
Dance Magazine review by Gus Solomons, Jr., January 2005 of Ballet Tech's MANDANCE PROJECT at the Joyce Theater
NY Times review by Jennifer Dunning May 1, 2006 of NYCB

Ballets by Eliot Feld
Ballets to the music of Paul Lansky
2004 ballet premieres
New York City Ballet repertory